Scandal Street is a 1938 American drama film directed by James P. Hogan and written by Bertram Millhauser and Eddie Welch. The film stars Lew Ayres, Louise Campbell, Roscoe Karns, Porter Hall, Edgar Kennedy and Elizabeth Patterson. The film was released on February 11, 1938, by Paramount Pictures.

Plot

Cast

Reception
Frank Nugent of The New York Times said, "The fictional half of the Criterion's bill is filled by a well-wrought B-plus melodrama from Paramount, an entertaining tidbit called Scandal Street, which considers, for the 'steenth time, the cruelty, malice and stupidity of small-town gossips. Here it is Louise Campbell who suffers the tongue-lashing and the guilty-until-proved-innocent attitude of Peach-tree Lane's residents when the married Don Juan in the next-door house is found murdered. Fortunately, she has wee Virginia Weidler on her side, as well as right, and the murder outs conveniently. As small-town profiles go, this is as definitive as the next, with penetrating sidelights on the weekly bridge nights, the children's dancing school, amours and civic pride."

References

External links 
 

1938 films
1930s English-language films
Paramount Pictures films
American drama films
1938 drama films
American black-and-white films
Films directed by James Patrick Hogan
1930s American films